Rubus originalis a rare North American species of brambles in the rose family. It has been found in the eastern United States (New Jersey, Maryland, West Virginia, and North Carolina). Nowhere is it common.

The genetics of Rubus is extremely complex, so that it is difficult to decide on which groups should be recognized as species. There are many rare species with limited ranges such as this. Further study is suggested to clarify the taxonomy.

References

originalis
Plants described in 1945
Flora of the Eastern United States